Hotel Chile is a hotel on the corner of May Avenue and Santiago del Estero Street, in the downtown Montserrat section of Buenos Aires, Argentina. Designed in 1907 by the French Architect Louis Dubois, a graduate of the École des Beaux-Arts in Paris, the 70-room hotel is one of the most prominent surviving local examples of the French Art Nouveau style.

History
It was designed by architect Louis Dubois in 1904 and opened in 1906 originally called Lutetia Hotel, and was one of the greatest representatives of Art Nouveau arrived in Argentina in the early twentieth century. The Avenida de Mayo was still a fashionable avenue, opened in 1896, where during the passage of the first decade of the styles used for buildings evolved, from academicism or Neoclassicism to Art Nouveau, Art Deco and later.

Moreover Avenue, which had been designed for residences of the aristocracy and great palaces, was exploited by the owners of the land to build apartment buildings there income (rent) which quickly mutated into hotels. At that historical moment was constructed Hotel Lutetia.

He later became National Hotel. In 1938, it changed hands and became Chile Hotel Romanelli, still owned by the hotelier Romanelli. Sunday May Avenue fell into decay over the decades and the shift of focus of the company to other sectors driven by its transformation into the artery leading political and social situations in the country. When connecting the Palace of Congress with the House of Government, political demonstrations and marches focused mainly on it.

The worst Hotel Chile disaster occurred on August 4, 1988, when a fire broke out at 0:30 am on the 4th floor, 2 extending to the attic (5th floor) and the dome, and totally consuming them within two hours. Also the front of the building was seriously damaged, large pieces of masonry falling into the street. The hotel was restored, replacing the slate mansard corrugated iron, without recovering his famous dome, and received through a facade. The neighboring building on Avenida de Mayo, designed by architect Dubois, was also affected by the incident, and had to be completely reworked then also lost its cupola bay window and run adorning its facade.

On the ground floor of the Hotel Chile, accessed through the facet, worked for years the Spanish restaurant Spain Square, one of several that specialize in traditional cuisine in this section of the Avenida de Mayo, artery historically adopted by the Spanish to their meetings and trade since the early twentieth century.

Gallery

References
 Bohm, Mimi. Buenos Aires, Art Nouveau. Ediciones Xavier Verstraeten, Buenos Aires, 2005.

Chile
Chile
Art Nouveau architecture in Buenos Aires
Chile
1906 establishments in Argentina